If You Give a Mouse a Cookie is an animated children's adventure comedy television series based on the 1985 book of the same name. The pilot was originally released on November 4, 2015; the series was later released on Amazon Video on November 7, 2017.

The show was followed by a Christmas special If You Give a Mouse a Christmas Cookie was released on November 24, 2016. The second season was released on September 27, 2019, with a Halloween special If You Give a Mouse a Pumpkin was released on October 25, 2019; a Valentine's Day special If You Give a Mouse a Valentine's Cookie was released on February 7, 2020. The series finale was released on October 14, 2021.

Premise
In the If You Give a Mouse a Cookie series, based on the book series by Laura Numeroff and Felicia Bond, the main characters are Mouse, Pig, Moose, Dog and Cat and several humans. The episodes revolve around their adventures.

Cast
 Oliver (voiced by Mason Mahay)
 Mouse (voiced by Roger Craig Smith)
 Cat (voiced by Lara Jill Miller)
 Dog (voiced by Jeff Bennett)
 Pig (voiced by Jessica DiCicco)
 Moose (voiced by Roger Craig Smith)
 Piper (voiced by Kyla Kenedy)
 Henry (voiced by Henry Kaufman)
 Leo (voiced by Benji Risley)
 Esme Louise (voiced by Scarlett Estevez)

Episodes

Season 1 (2017–2019)
Applesauce/Cat And Mouse (November 7, 2017)
 Mouse to the Rescue!/The Amazing Art Chase (November 7, 2017)
 The Big Campout/Missing Sock! (November 7, 2017)
 Hoopla!/Animal Band (November 7, 2017)
 Mouse Minds the Store/Captain Mouse (November 7, 2017)
 Town Fair/Beach Day (November 7, 2017)
 If You Take a Mouse to School/Cookie Factory (November 7, 2017)
 Muffin Party/Arcade (November 7, 2017)
 A House for Mouse/Delivery Mouse (November 7, 2017)
 Something to Squawk About/Sick Day (November 7, 2017)
 Dinosaur Mystery/Inventor Fair (November 7, 2017)
 Farm Friends/Picnic (November 7, 2017)
 Toy Round Up!/Masked Mouse Mobile (November 7, 2017)
 Recycle Races/Change is Good (June 25, 2018)
 Dog's Day Out/Doggie Day Camp (June 25, 2018)
 Treasure Hunt!/A Surprise for Henry (June 25, 2018)
 Sledding Adventure/Snowy Sleepover (June 25, 2018)
 Mouse Around/Rainy Day (June 25, 2018)
 Day at the Museum/Pizza Delivery (June 25, 2018)
 Friendaversary/Runaway Robot (February 14, 2019)
 Mousey Mail/Lost Sticker (February 14, 2019)
 Bowling Bonanza!/Underwater Mouse (February 14, 2019)'
 Charm Mystery/New Neighbor (February 14, 2019)
 Egg Hunt/The Masked Mouse Rides Again (February 14, 2019)
 Keeping Cool/Parade Day (February 14, 2019)
 Quest for the Cup/Goodnight Mouse (February 14, 2019)

Season 2 (2019–2021)

Looking After Lovey/The Old Shell Game (September 27, 2019)
 A Space Odd-issy/Stuff-on-a-Stick (September 27, 2019)
 Pig Puts on a Show/A Little Pig Pizazz (September 27, 2019)
 A Token of Friendship/Robot Rivalry (September 27, 2019)
 Hiccup Hutch/Do The Dog (September 27, 2019)
 Picnic Express/Safari Express (July 23, 2020)
 The Caped Moose/Leo's Loose Tooth (July 23, 2020)
 Dog vs. the Two-Wheeler/If You Give a Dog a Bath (July 23, 2020)
 Dinosaurs for a Day/Magical Moose (July 23, 2020)
 Snowy the Snowbot/Night at the Museum (July 23, 2020)
 Mouse and the Toy Factory/Teacher Appreciation Day (July 23, 2020)
 The Quest for the Golden Treasure/Firefighter Mouse (March 25, 2021)
 Carnival Time/Summertastic Day (March 25, 2021)
 Copydog/Sweet Dreams (March 25, 2021)
 Mother's Day Mouse/If You Give a Mouse a Camera (March 25, 2021)
 Cousin Party/Quiet Contest (March 25, 2021)
 Sleepover Slip-up/Dancing in Style (March 25, 2021)
 The Haunted Toolshed/Backyard Obstacle Course (October 14, 2021)
 Piper's Circus Surprise/Friendship Flower Power (October 14, 2021)
 Chalk-Tastrophe/Gell Well, Oliver (October 14, 2021)
 Messy Guest/Catchy Tune (October 14, 2021)
 Masked Mouse: The Ultimate Challenge/Door-to-Door Dilemma (October 14, 2021)
 Super Super Superheroes/Princess-Cowgirl-Pirate Pig (October 14, 2021)
 Mouse Day Celebration/Mouse and the Cookiestalk (October 14, 2021)

References

External links
 

2010s American animated television series
2020s American animated television series
2017 American television series debuts
2010s Canadian animated television series
2020s Canadian animated television series
2017 Canadian television series debuts
American children's animated adventure television series
American children's animated comedy television series
Canadian children's animated adventure television series
Canadian children's animated comedy television series
Amazon Prime Video children's programming
Animated television series by Amazon Studios
Animated television series about mice and rats
English-language television shows
American television shows based on children's books
Canadian television shows based on children's books
Cookies in popular culture